Spirama euspira is a species of moth of the family Erebidae. It was apparently proposed as a name for what Cramer misidentified as Spirama retorta in 1780. However, the identity of this species is unknown.

References

Moths described in 1823
Spirama